Aristocrats is a 1999 television series based on the biography by Stella Tillyard of the four aristocratic Lennox sisters in 18th century England. The series consists of six episodes of 50 minutes each and was first broadcast in the United Kingdom on BBC, starting on 20 June 1999. It was a co-production between the United Kingdom, the United States, and Ireland.

Episodes
Episode 1 - broadcast 20 June 1999
Episode 2 - broadcast 27 June 1999
Episode 3 - broadcast 4 July 1999
Episode 4 - broadcast 11 July 1999
Episode 5 - broadcast 18 July 1999
Episode 6 - broadcast 25 July 1999

Cast

Awards
The series was nominated in 1999 for two Awards by the Irish Film and Television Awards for
"Best Craft Contribution," and "Best Television Drama." It also was nominated for two awards by the Royal Television Society, including " Best Costume Design," and "Best Make Up."

DVD release
All six parts of the miniseries were released in a DVD boxset on 8 August 2006. The set includes three discs containing all the episodes.

References

DVD-featurettes on "Aristocrats"-DVD

External links
 
 

BBC television dramas
Television series set in the 18th century
1990s British drama television series
1999 British television series debuts
1999 British television series endings
English-language television shows
1990s British television miniseries
Television shows set in the Republic of Ireland